The 1920-21 National Challenge Cup was the 9th edition of the oldest ongoing competition in American soccer.

The competition began with 118 teams separated into an eastern and western division, eventually narrowing to St. Louis Scullin Steel F.C. of the St. Louis Soccer League (SLSL) and Todd Shipyards of the American Soccer League.  The title game was originally scheduled to take place at Federal Field in St. Louis, Missouri, the SLSL's main stadium.  However, in May 1922, the USFA directed a change in venue after the fees to be charged by the field became exorbitant.  After an extensive search, USFA settled on High School Field in St. Louis.  On March 19, 1922, Scullin Steel defeated Todd Shipyards to become the second St. Louis team to win the trophy.

Bracket
Home teams listed on top of bracket

w/o: walkover/forfeit victory awarded

Final

See also
1922 American Cup

Sources
thecup.us

References

U.S. Open Cup
Nat